David Lee Craven (1951 – 11 February 2012) was Distinguished Professor of Art and Art History at the University of New Mexico. He was a specialist in the art of Latin America.

Selected publications
The New Concept of Art and Popular Culture in Nicaragua Since the Revolution in 1979: An Analytical Essay and Compendium of Illustrations. Lewiston, New York: Edwin Mellen Press, 1989. 
Diego Rivera as Epic Modernist. G.K. Hall & Co., 1997. 
Poetics and Politics in the Life of Rudolph Baranik. Humanities Press, Atlantic Highlands, NJ, 1997. 
Abstract Expression as Cultural Critique: Dissent During the McCarthy Period. Cambridge University Press, Cambridge, 1999. 
Art and Revolution in Latin America, 1910-1990. Yale University Press, New Haven, 2002. 
Dialectical Conversions: Donald Kuspit's Art Criticism. Liverpool University Press, Liverpool, 2011.

References

External links

David Craven Papers - University of New Mexico, University Libraries, Center for Southwest Research

2012 deaths
American art historians
University of New Mexico faculty
University of North Carolina alumni
1951 births